Ágnes Kunhalmi (born 31 October 1982) is a Hungarian socialist politician. She is a Member of the National Assembly since the 2014 election, and a Member of the executive board of the Hungarian Socialist Party, since 2018. She is the Female co-chair of the Hungarian Socialist Party, since 19 September 2020.

References

1982 births
Living people
Hungarian Socialist Party politicians
Members of the National Assembly of Hungary (2014–2018)
Members of the National Assembly of Hungary (2018–2022)
Members of the National Assembly of Hungary (2022–2026)
Women members of the National Assembly of Hungary